Charles Bee Martin (July 12, 1931 – December 8, 2012) was an American politician.

Martin was born in Curry, Alabama, in Walker County, Alabama, and worked for Monsanto, an agricultural business. From Decatur, Alabama, Martin served on the Decatur city council. He also served in both houses of the Alabama Legislature and on the Alabama Public Service Commission. He died in Decatur, Alabama.

Notes

1931 births
2012 deaths
People from Walker County, Alabama
Politicians from Decatur, Alabama
Alabama city council members
Members of the Alabama House of Representatives
Alabama state senators